Welfrange is a village in the commune of Dalheim, in south-eastern Luxembourg.  , the village has a population of 139.

See also
 List of villages in Luxembourg

Dalheim
Villages in Luxembourg